Berkin Kamil Arslan (born 3 February 1992) is a Turkish footballer who currently plays as a winger for Manisa BB.

In June 2007, he signed a three-year contract with Galatasaray which was later extended by another two years. After 78 matches for the reserve team he joined Kartalspor on loan in January 2012. His contract with Galatasaray expired in May 2012 and he joined Şanlıurfaspor.

References

BERKİN ARSLAN BÜYÜKŞEHİR’E İMZA ATTI, 45haber.com, 25 December 2015

External links
Statistics at TFF.org 
 

1992 births
Living people
People from Milas
Turkish footballers
Association football wingers
Galatasaray S.K. footballers
Kartalspor footballers
Şanlıurfaspor footballers
Bucaspor footballers
Manisa FK footballers
Süper Lig players
Turkey youth international footballers